Deram may refer to:
 Deram Records, a former subsidiary record label established in 1966 by Decca Records in the United Kingdom
 Đeram or Stari Đeram, a district of Belgrade, Serbia
 Darram or Derām, a village in Iran
 Deram, Mazandaran, a village in Iran
 Dirhami, village in Estonia also known as Deram and Derhamn